Triple Play was the name of the 2005 season FIRST Robotics Competition game.

Basic Description

Triple Play was the FIRST Robotics Competition game released on January 8, 2005. This is the first time the game rules PDF files were made available in late December to teams prior to the official release. The files with an alpha numeric password featuring the game's name. The password was 2005tr1pl3pl4y.

This game was the first to feature three robots per alliance. The game was played on a field set up like a tic-tac-toe board, with nine larger goals, also shaped as tetras in three rows of three. The object of the game was to place the scoring tetras on the larger goals, creating rows of three by having a tetra of your alliance’s color at the highest point on the goal. Triple Play was a strategically intensive game, requiring quick thinking on the part of the drivers and operators to optimize the field for their alliance.

Game play
Tetras scored on the top of a goal were worth 3 points, while tetras contained inside the goals were worth 1 point. A goal was "owned" by the alliance whose color tetra highest on or inside the goal. Rows of three owned goals garnered the alliance an additional 10 points per at the end of regulation play. Ten points could also be scored if all three alliance robots were behind the alliance line at their end of the field at the end of the game.

The playing field consisted of nine goals placed at equal intervals across the field in rows of three. At the beginning of each match, the 4 corner goals had hanging tetras, and robots would be able to keep the tetras in the goals only if they knocked them down during the autonomous mode. On the side of the playing field were the automatic loading zones. These platforms were kept with a constant supply of a single tetra for a robot to pick up and bring into play. On the opposing side of the field was the Human Player Loading Zone, where human players could run out and hook a tetra on their robot. By doing this, however, a human player disabled their robot until such a time as they returned to their platform. In the spaces between the center row of goals and the home rows, four "Vision Tetras" were placed. A robot could locate these autonomously to score extra points, but were otherwise treated as regular tetras during regulation.

Terminology
Center row – the row of goals running parallel to the player stations in the center of the field. The middle goal of the center row is a much higher target than the standard goal.
Contained – a tetra that is placed entirely under a goal. No part of the contained tetra is allowed to touch the carpet outside of the goal. However, the tetra is allowed to hang outside the goal if it is only touching the goal itself. A contained tetra is worth 1 point.
Far row – the row furthest from the player station, running along the wall of the opposing player station.
Home row – the line of goals directly along the player station of an alliance.
Owned – an alliance owns a goal on one of 4 occasions: if it has the highest contained tetra in a goal with no stacked tetras, if it has the topmost stacked tetra, if it stacked a vision tetra on any goal OR if the opposing alliance at any point removed a stacked tetra.
Stacked – a tetra that is placed and securely fit on top of a goal. A stacked tetra is worth 3 points.
Tetra – the game piece.  A 30"x30"x30" Tetrahedron constructed entirely of PVC pipe. Came in blue and red to denote alignment.
The vision tetras were placed randomly in one of 8 spots on each side of the field before autonomous mode.

Events

The following regional events were held in 2005:
 Arizona Regional - Phoenix
 BAE Systems Granite State Regional - Manchester, NH
 Boilermaker Regional - West Lafayette, IN
 Buckeye Regional - Cleveland, OH
 Chesapeake Regional - Annapolis, MD
 Colorado Regional - Denver
 Detroit Regional - Detroit
 Finger Lakes Regional - Rochester, NY
 Florida Regional - Orlando
 GM/Technion University Israel Pilot Regional - Haifa, Israel (pilot)
 Great Lakes Regional - Ypsilanti, MI
 Greater Toronto Regional - Mississauga, ON
 Las Vegas Regional - Las Vegas
 Lone Star Regional - Houston
 Midwest Regional - Chicago
 NASA/VCU Regional - Richmond, VA
 New Jersey Regional - Trenton, NJ
 New York City Regional - New York City
 Pacific Northwest Regional - Portland
 Palmetto Regional - Columbia, SC
 Peachtree Regional - Duluth, GA
 Philadelphia Regional - Philadelphia
 Pittsburgh Regional - Pittsburgh
 St. Louis Regional - St. Charles, MO
 Sacramento Regional - Davis, CA
 SBPLI Long Island Regional - Hempstead, NY
 Silicon Valley Regional - San Jose, CA
 Southern California Regional - Los Angeles
 UTC New England Regional - Hartford, CT
 Waterloo Regional - Waterloo, ON
 West Michigan Regional - Allendale, MI

The championship was held in the Georgia Dome, Atlanta.

References

Official FIRST documentation for this game

2005 in robotics
FIRST Robotics Competition games